Stilo can refer to:
 Stilo town, located in Calabria, Italy.
 Stilo company, developer of the OmniMark software.
 the cape and lighthouse of the same name in Poland.
 Fiat Stilo, compact automobile produced by the Italian manufacturer Fiat from 2001 to 2007.
 Stilo helmets factory, located in Treviolo, Lombardy, Italy and very popular in rallying field.
 A metallic stick to write on clay and wooden tablets.